The M132 Armored Flamethrower (nicknamed "Zippo") was a United States built flamethrower armed variant of the M113 and M113A1 armored personnel carriers developed in the early 1960s. Approximately 350 were accepted into service.

History
The first prototype of the vehicle was produced in August 1962 when a flamethrower was mounted on a M113. This prototype was only used in combat situations four times that year.

In December 1964, the First Armored Cavalry was sent two M132 flamethrower armored vehicles. Based on combat experiences with the vehicle the Army Concept Team advised that four M132s and two M113s be shipped to each regiment.

Standard operating procedure was to use the 7.62mm coaxial machine-gun to suppress the target until the M132 could be maneuvered into the flamethrower range. Sometimes a “wet burst” of unignited fuel would be sprayed into the target first, only to be ignited by a second “flaming burst.” This was found to do more damage to the target.

Description
The vehicle was based on an M113. The driver sits in the front left of the hull. The gunner sits in a small cupola in the center of the hull which mounts an M10-8 flame gun with a coaxial 7.62 mm caliber M73 machine gun. The weapons could be traversed though 360 degrees and elevated to +55 degrees and depressed to −15 degree. The passenger compartment was removed, and replaced with an M10 fuel and pressure unit and four spherical 50 gallon fuel tanks.

The 200 gallon fuel capacity enabled it to fire for up to 32 seconds, and the pressure unit enabled it to reach targets at a range of 170 meters (186 yards).

References

Notes

See also
List of flamethrowers

Flamethrowers of the United States
Armored fighting vehicles of the United States
Tracked armoured fighting vehicles
Military vehicles introduced in the 1960s